Augustus Stoner Decker (July 20, 1813 – May 2, 1872) was the 18th mayor of Columbus, Ohio during the year 1846. He was appointed mayor after Alexander Patton left the position early. Decker was born in Pennsylvania in 1813 and later moved to Columbus, Ohio with his family.

References

Bibliography

External links 

Augustus Stoner Decker at BillionGraves
Augustus Stoner Decker at Political Graveyard

1813 births
1872 deaths
Burials at Green Lawn Cemetery (Columbus, Ohio)
Mayors of Columbus, Ohio
Ohio Whigs
19th-century American politicians
Politicians from Reading, Pennsylvania